Henry Rice Guild (October 22, 1928 – April 22, 2019) was an American lawyer and director of the Pioneer Fund (1948–1974).

According to the Pioneer Fund biography, he was a lieutenant in the United States Navy in World War I. He graduated Harvard College and Harvard Law School. He practiced at Herrick Smith, Boston.

Guild was a trustee of Massachusetts General Hospital, a director Audubon Society, chair of the Greater Boston Community Fund, and chair of the Massachusetts Department of Public Welfare.

References

Pioneer Fund Founders and Former Directors

1928 births
2019 deaths
Lawyers from Boston
Harvard Law School alumni
Massachusetts lawyers
Massachusetts General Hospital people
Harvard College alumni
United States Navy personnel of World War I
20th-century American lawyers